Quadricycle refers to vehicles with four wheels.

In 1896 Henry Ford named his first vehicle design the "Quadricycle". it ran on four bicycle wheels, with an engine driving the back wheels.

In the United States, a similar classification is the low-speed vehicle class.

 Ford Quadricycle, Henry Ford's first design
Burnard Jarstfer Quadricycle (replica based on Ford Quadricycle)
 Orient Quadricycle (aka Orient Autogo)
 Truffault Quadricycle
Le Rudge Quadricycle Tandem
De Dion Bouton 1900 Quadricycle
De Dion Bouton Victoria Quadricycle
De Dion Bouton "La Marquise" Quadricycle (Steam runabout)
Peugeot Type 3 Quadricycle
1889 Daimler Quadricycle

Additional motorized four-wheelers:
Duryea Motor Wagon
Benz Velo

Quadricycle, quadracycle, quadcycle, quadrocycle and quad all refer to vehicles with four wheels. More specifically these terms may refer to:
 All-terrain vehicle, also known as quad or quad bike
 Automobile, the first experimental steam automobiles were termed steam quadricycles
 Low-speed vehicle, referred to in some countries as a quadricycle
 Quadricycle, European classifications for light four-wheeled motorized vehicles: light quadricycles, category L6e, and (heavy) quadricycles, category L7e
 Quadracycle, a four-wheeled style of cycle 
 Velomobile, an enclosed human-powered vehicle

See also
Cyclecar
Horse and buggy
Horseless carriage/Brass Era car
List of motorized trikes
Safety bicycle
Steam locomotive
Tricycle
Unicycle
Wagon
List of land vehicles types by number of wheels

References

Quadricycles